Voosi kurk is a strait in Estonia, locating between Vormsi and Noarootsi Peninsula; this strait is part of Väinameri.

Several islets are located in the strait: Nätegrunne, Seasaar, Ulassaar, Väike-Tjuka.

It is supposed that the name "Voosi" is derived from former inn called Voosi Inn.

References

Geography of Estonia